Dark Room is the debut studio album by Italian singer Michele Morrone. It was released by Agora, Polydor Germany and Universal Music Group on February 14, 2020. It is partly a promotion for the film 365 Days.

Critical reception 
The album was given a bad review by Interia journalist Paweł Waliński. He called the album an "extremely tasteless, aggressive promotion" for 365 Days. He compared the studio album to "a dwarf that shows up during a pâté feast". He noted that Morrone did not know how to sing completely, and wrote about the musicians who participated in the recording of the songs that they played "in a decent craftsman's class".

In her review Agnieszka Szachowska, writing for the portal Kulturalne Media, mentioned the fact that four songs from the album were used in the film 365 Days. She explained that the lyrics and music of the songs were "sensual, but definitely commercial". She wrote that "the potential was only shown in the last 3 songs of the album". He also described the album as "not too ambitious rock/pop album".

Track listing 
Track listing and credits adapted from Tidal.

Notes
  – production for the remixed version

Charts

Weekly charts

Year-end charts

Certifications

Release history

References 

Pop rock albums by Italian artists
Polydor Records albums
Universal Music Group albums
2020 debut albums